Mena is a crater in the Beethoven quadrangle on Mercury. Its name was adopted by the International Astronomical Union in 1976. Mena is named for the Spanish poet Juan de Mena, who lived from 1411 to 1456.

Mena lies on the eastern rim of a larger unnamed crater, which is in turn within the much larger crater Vieira da Silva.

References

External links
 
 

Impact craters on Mercury